Innar Mändoja (born 27 February 1978) is an Estonian former professional racing cyclist, who rode for the  squad from 2000 to 2002. He competed in the road race at the 2000 Summer Olympics, although he did not finish.

References

External links

1978 births
Living people
Cyclists at the 2000 Summer Olympics
Estonian male cyclists
Olympic cyclists of Estonia
Sportspeople from Jõgeva